Portumna GAA is a Gaelic Athletic Association club located in the town of Portumna in County Galway.  The club is almost exclusively centred on hurling.

History
The first mention of Portumna in terms of Gaelic games comes in 1888 with regard to a junior Gaelic football game against Eyrecourt.  The club remained in the background of senior club hurling until 1995 when Portumna contested their first county final.  Victory on that occasion went to Sarsfield's.  The 2000s saw a golden age for the club as it contested seven consecutive county finals between 2003 and 2009.  Victory was achieved in 2003, 2005, 2007, 2008 and 2009.  Portumna also won three All-Ireland titles during this period (2006, 2008 and 2009) as well as in returning to win in 2014. A book on the history of the club titled ‘Hearts of Oak the rise to glory of Portumna GAA club’, written by historian John Joe Conwell, has been published by the club.

Hurling honours
All-Ireland Senior Club Hurling Championships (4): 2006, 2008, 2009, 2014 
Connacht Senior Club Hurling Championships (3): 2003, 2005, 2007 
Galway Senior Hurling Championships (6): 2003, 2005, 2007, 2008, 2009, 2013
 Galway Intermediate Hurling Club Championships (1): 1992
 Galway Minor Hurling Championships (4): 1948, 1990, 1991, 1999

Notable players
Damien Hayes
Kevin Hayes
Ollie Canning
Joe Canning
Andy Smith
Martin Dolphin
Liam Noone

References

External links
Portumna GAA site

Gaelic games clubs in County Galway
Hurling clubs in County Galway